Jazz for the Jet Set is an album by American jazz vibraphonist Dave Pike which was recorded in 1965 for the Atlantic label.

Reception

The Allmusic site awarded the album 3 stars stating "This disc is a bit unusual in a few ways. Vibraphonist Dave Pike sticks here exclusively to the marimba, while pianist Herbie Hancock is heard throughout on organ, an instrument he rarely played again... Most of the music consists of obscurities and is open to the influences of the boogaloo and pop rhythms of the era... An interesting effort".

Track listing
All compositions by Dave Pike except as indicated
 "Blind Man, Blind Man" (Herbie Hancock) - 6:52
 "Jet Set" - 5:49
 "Sunny" (Bobby Hebb) - 3:20
 "When I'm Gone" - 2:59
 "You've Got Your Troubles" (Roger Cook, Roger Greenaway) - 4:09
 "Sweet 'Tater Pie" (Rodgers Grant) - 3:50
 "Just Say Goodbye" (Rodgers Grant, Ruth Grant) - 4:36
 "Devilette" (Hettye Taylor, Ben Tucker) - 6:04  
Recorded in New York City on October 26  (tracks 1, 5, 7 & 8) and November 2 (tracks 2-4 & 6), 1965

Personnel 
Dave Pike - marimba 
Melvin Lastie (tracks 2-4 & 6), Marty Sheller (tracks 1, 5, 7 & 8), Clark Terry - trumpet 
Herbie Hancock - organ
Billy Butler - guitar
Bob Cranshaw - bass (tracks 1, 5, 7 & 8)
Jimmy Lewis - electric bass (tracks 2-4 & 6)
Bruno Carr (tracks 1, 5, 7 & 8), Grady Tate (tracks 2-4 & 6) - drums

References 

1966 albums
Dave Pike albums
Atlantic Records albums